This page provides supplementary chemical data on formic acid.

Material Safety Data Sheet  

The handling of this chemical may incur notable safety precautions. It is highly recommend that you seek the Material Safety Datasheet (MSDS) for this chemical from a reliable source and follow its directions.
MSDS from FLUKA in the SDSdata.org database
Science Stuff

Structure and properties

Thermodynamic properties

Vapor pressure of liquid

Table data obtained from CRC Handbook of Chemistry and Physics, 44th ed. The "(s)" notation indicates temperature of solid/vapor equilibrium. Otherwise the data is temperature of liquid/vapor equilibrium.

Distillation data

Spectral data

Safety data

References

Chemical data pages
Chemical data pages cleanup